Morton Sanford Garson (20 July 1924 – 4 January 2008) was a Canadian composer, arranger, songwriter, and pioneer of electronic music. He is best known for his albums in the 1960s and 1970s, such as Mother Earth's Plantasia (1976), He also co-wrote several hit songs, including "Our Day Will Come", a hit for Ruby & the Romantics. According to Allmusic, "Mort Garson boasts one of the most unique and outright bizarre resumés in popular music, spanning from easy listening to occult-influenced space-age electronic pop."

Early life
Mort Garson was born in Saint John, New Brunswick, Canada, the son of Russian Jewish refugees. He later moved to New York City where he studied music at the Juilliard School of Music. He worked as a pianist and arranger before being called into the Army near the end of World War II.

Early career
After leaving the forces he became an active session musician, with an ability to carry out any or all of the musical chores on any given session: composer, arranger, orchestrator, conductor, and pianist as required. In 1957, he co-wrote Brenda Lee's minor hit "Dynamite" with Tom Glazer, and he also co-wrote Cliff Richard's 1961 UK hit "Theme for a Dream". In 1963, with lyricist Bob Hilliard, he wrote one of the great lounge hits of the 1960s, "Our Day Will Come", a hit for Ruby & The Romantics and later covered by k.d. lang and Take 6 for the soundtrack of the movie Shag.

Garson spent the mid-1960s on a rapid succession of accompaniment and arrangement jobs: two Doris Day albums (Doris Day's Sentimental Journey and Latin for Lovers), Mel Tormé's Right Now! album of contemporary covers like "Secret Agent Man," and Glenn Yarborough's highly successful cover of Rod McKuen songs, The Lonely Things. He also arranged for the Lettermen on Capitol Records, provided background to Laurence Harvey reading poetry on Atlantic Records, and provided arrangements for Esther Phillips, Julie London, Nancy Wilson, Chris Montez, Leslie Uggams, Joanie Sommers, Paul Revere and the Raiders, and many others. He was a favorite of producers when the job involved soft pop vocal groups and string ensembles, and was responsible for a wide variety of easy listening records, including Bossa Nova for All Ages by the Continentals, Symphony for the Soul by the Total Eclipse, and Sea Drift by the Dusk 'Til Dawn Orchestra.  In 1967, he arranged and produced Bill Withers' early single, "Three Nights and a Morning".

With Perry Botkin Jr., he arranged and conducted easy listening arrangements of big pop hits, among them the Hollyridge Strings' Play the Beatles Songbook album series and their Play the Hits of Simon & Garfunkel. He also worked on albums and singles by The Sugar Shoppe, the Sunset Strings, and the Love Strings, and released singles under his own name. He arranged The Sandpipers' 1966 hit, "Guantanamera", and co-wrote its B-side "What Makes You Dream, Pretty Girl?" with lyricist Jacques Wilson, with whom he worked on later projects.

Later career
In 1967, Garson met Robert Moog at a music engineers' convention, and started to use an early Moog synthesizer.  Garson became one of the first arrangers and composers to work with the Moog synthesizer, and his electronic albums from the period are now highly prized among collectors and exotica fans. A suite of Garson compositions with words by Jacques Wilson, released on Elektra Records, The Zodiac: Cosmic Sounds – Celestial Counterpoint with Words and Music, includes tracks for each of the 12 signs of the zodiac. While Garson was writing the music, he was introduced to Robert Moog and decided to incorporate his invention into the album. The recording features Paul Beaver on a variety of electronic instruments with voice-overs by Cyrus Faryar. Released in late 1967, it was the first album recorded on the West Coast to make use of the Moog synthesizer.

Also in 1967, he arranged the obscure single "See The Cheetah", credited to the Big Game Hunters. In 1968, he was responsible for the string arrangements on Glen Campbell's international hit "By the Time I Get to Phoenix," and arranged two tracks on his album of the same title.

Another moog album, Electronic Hair Pieces, covered songs from the hippie-influenced musical, Hair. The mod album cover art for Electronic Hair Pieces featured a model with a wired-up skull; liner notes were provided by Tom Smothers of the Smothers Brothers. Another album, The Wozard of Iz, a psychedelic satire based on The Wizard of Oz, also with words by Jacques Wilson, featured Bernie Krause providing environmental sound effects and Suzie Jane Hokom voicing Dorothy.  Garson was quoted at the time: "An electronic composer utilises the synthesizer as a means of expression.. Of course he must remain master of the instrument and not vice versa, but given the unique vehicle, he has the medium in which, almost literally, the sky's the limit for his imagination."

Following the success of the original Zodiac LP, Garson went on to compose and arrange a 12 album series of zodiac albums for A&M Records, one album for each sign. Like Zodiac, each album contained original tunes with heavy use of electronics. In 1971, he composed an entirely instrumental electronic Black Mass album, released on Uni Records under the pseudonym Lucifer, that again featured the Moog. Jason Alkeny at Allmusic describes the Black Mass album as "undoubtedly... his masterpiece". Garson also released, in 1972, a record of music-and-moans, Music for Sensuous Lovers, to capitalize on the best-seller at the time, The Sensuous Woman by "Z". In 1974, he composed the electronic music score for the 18th Annual Grammy Award winning Best Children's Recording of The Little Prince narrated by Richard Burton. The following year, he released an album titled Ataraxia: The Unexplained designed to accompany meditations to the mantra of the listener's choice. Mother Earth's Plantasia, which was released in 1976, was a series of Moog compositions designed to be played for growing plants. According to his daughter, Day Darmet, Garson made the album inspired by her mother's plants. Despite its extremely limited distribution, the album became a cult hit in the late 2010s when it was circulated online.

In 2018, independent reissue label Rubellan Remasters licensed and released on CD for the first time Garson's two occult-themed albums, remastered from original studio tapes.  In 2019 and 2020, a further set of Garson albums, including Plantasia which is now seen as his best-known album, and a set of previously unreleased recordings, Music from Patch Cord Productions, were issued both on CD and vinyl by Sacred Bones.

Films, television and theatre work
Garson also worked in television and film, scoring a wide variety of music for many different movies and TV shows, from Beware! The Blob! to Kentucky Fried Movie to National Geographic specials, although it is Elmer Bernstein who is credited with composing the well-known National Geographic orchestral theme that first appeared in on the magazine's TV specials in 1966.

Garson's music was used as incidental music during the television transmissions of the Apollo 11 manned moon landing by Neil Armstrong and Buzz Aldrin in 1969. He said: "The only sounds that go along with space travel are electronic ones... The Apollo film shows different facets of the flight – blastoff, separation of the stages of the rocket, scenes of the moon at close range, of the astronauts playing games in the ship and of earthrise. [The music] has to carry the film along. It has to echo the sound of the blastoff and even the static you hear on the astronauts' report from space. People are used to hearing things from outer space, not just seeing them. So I used a big, symphonic sound for the blastoff, some jazzy things for the zero-G game of catch, psychedelic music for a section that uses negatives and diffuse colors on shots taken inside the ship, and a pretty melody for the moon. After all, it's still a lovely moon."

In 1972 he wrote the music for the Larry Hagman-directed movie Son of Blob (also known as Beware! The Blob). He also scored the 1974 Fred Williamson film Black Eye, and adapted the music for Mel Brooks' and Carl Reiner's 1975 animated television special The 2000 Year Old Man.

In 1983 he composed the score for the West End musical Marilyn!, which opened at the Adelphi Theatre on 17 March 1983. Jacques Wilson wrote the lyrics for the show which starred Stephanie Lawrence as Marilyn Monroe. He then scored the action films Treasure of the Amazon (1985) and Vultures (1987), which both starred Stuart Whitman.

In 2002 Garson composed the score for "When Garbo Talks!," a musical with book and lyrics by Buddy Kaye that had its world premiere 15 October 2010 at the Long Beach Performing Arts Center, International City Theatre.

Garson was closely associated with Heatter-Quigley Productions, creating the theme songs and music cues for the following TV game shows:
Amateur's Guide to Love
Gambit
Runaround
Baffle
The Magnificent Marble Machine
Battlestars
The music for the first five featured Garson playing synthesizers, but the Battlestars package used more conventional marching band orchestration.

Death
Garson died of renal failure in San Francisco in 2008, at the age of 83.

In popular culture

A sample from Garson's "Planetary Motivations (Cancer)" was incorporated into DJ Shadow's 1996 song "Building Steam with a Grain of Salt," from the album Endtroducing...... In the 1994 Peter Lynch short film Arrowhead, Ray Bud (played by Don McKellar) manipulates a dead fish while singing Mort Garson's closing theme to the 1970s Canadian nature program Untamed World. The song "Plantasia" from the album Mother Earth's Plantasia is used in the documentary Lil Bub & Friendz and in the german TV show Böhmi brutzelt with Jan Böhmermann.

"Deja Vu" was used as the main theme for most of "Balance", the first arc of the Maximum Fun podcast The Adventure Zone, with "The Unexplained," "Astral Projection," "Cabala," "Wind Dance," "Tarot," and "Music to Soothe the Savage Snake Plant" also being used later on the series as an alternate theme and as background music, respectively, along with a cover version of "Plantasia," arranged by Griffin McElroy. The song was also sampled on Kid Cudi’s 2016 song, "Baptized in Fire", from his album Passion, Pain & Demon Slayin', which also features Travis Scott.

Discography

References

External links
 
 Mort Garson feature, 2016
 Mort Garson Reissues, 2020

1924 births
2008 deaths
Canadian male composers
Canadian music arrangers
Jewish Canadian musicians
Deaths from kidney failure
Musicians from Saint John, New Brunswick
20th-century Canadian composers
20th-century Canadian male musicians
Canadian expatriates in the United States
Canadian people of Russian descent
People from New York City
20th-century Canadian pianists